is a former Japanese football player.

Club statistics

References

External links

FC Machida Zelvia

1983 births
Living people
Kokushikan University alumni
Association football people from Saga Prefecture
Japanese footballers
J2 League players
Japan Football League players
Sagan Tosu players
FC Ryukyu players
FC Machida Zelvia players
Association football midfielders